Generalov is a Russian masculine surname, its feminine counterpart is Generalova. Notable people with the surname include:
Olga Generalova (born 1972), Russian triathlete
Vasily Generalov (1867–1887), Russian revolutionary
Yegor Generalov (born 1993), Russian football player

Russian-language surnames